Náníbaaʼ Garrison (Diné) is a bioethicist, geneticist, and associate professor in the Institute for Society and Genetics and Department of Internal Medicine at the University of California, Los Angeles. She is a member of the Navajo Nation, and her career has focused on studies of health conditions prevalent in, and attitudes toward genetics research among, the Navajo community.

Education 
Garrison earned her Ph.D. in the Department of Genetics at Stanford University, which was supported by a National Institutes of Health F31 fellowship. There, she studied the genetic architecture of human pigmentary variation, and afterward, she completed a postdoctoral fellowship at the University’s biomedical ethics department. There, supported by her NIH F32 fellowship, she investigated the impact of the ASU Board of Regents v. Havasupai Tribe lawsuit on genetics research and Institutional Review Boards (IRBs). Notably, Garrison conducted interviews of IRB chairs and human genetics researchers with regard to the Havasupai lawsuit, and published recommendations for the structuring and regulation of future genetics research studies with Indigenous populations.

Research and career

Research 
In 2015, Garrison joined the Division of Bioethics in the Department of Pediatrics at the University of Washington School of Medicine. In 2016, she received a 5-year National Institutes of Health K01 career development award, 'Genomics and Native Communities: Perspectives, Ethics, and Engagement' to explore perspectives of tribal leaders, physicians, scientists, and policy makers with respect to genetic research with Indigenous communities.

In 2019, Garrison received a grant to collaborate with pharmaceutics researcher Katrina Claw to conduct a survey of Navajo leaders, educators, and community members about their concerns regarding genetics research in tribal communities. She has also played a role in the negotiations between the Navajo Nation and the NIH that have resulted in a data-sharing agreement. This agreement will allow researchers to access health information of consenting Navajo participants; however, this does not permit access to genetic data or biological samples, which has been banned since 2002.

Public engagement and outreach 
Garrison co-facilitates the Summer Internship for Indigenous Peoples (SING), which consists of an international set of workshops that focus on facilitating discussions on Indigenous people's cultural values and building capacity to increase the number of Indigenous peoples in science research, leadership and teaching careers. Garrison serves as a Member on the Advisory Council of the United States Indigenous Data Sovereignty Network.

Awards and honors 
In 2009, Garrison received the 12th Annual Anne Ninham Medicine Mentorship Award from the American Indian Staff Forum at Stanford University. In 2012, she attended the Society for the Advancement of Chicanos and Native Americans in Science (SACNAS) Leadership Institute, sponsored by SACNAS and the American Association for the Advancement of Science.

References 

Year of birth missing (living people)
Living people
21st-century Native Americans
Bioethicists
Native American women academics
American women academics
Native American academics
Navajo scientists
Stanford University alumni
University of Washington faculty
Women geneticists
21st-century Native American women
Native American women scientists